Jo Christiaens (born 17 April 1988) is a Belgian former professional footballer, who played as a defender, and current head coach of KFC Turnhout.

Managerial career
Having retired at the end of the 2019–20 season, Christiaens was appointed head coach of KFC Turnhout on 5 March 2020 for the 2020–21 season.

References

Living people
1988 births
Association football defenders
Belgian footballers
K.V.C. Westerlo players
AS Verbroedering Geel players
Belgian Pro League players
Challenger Pro League players
Lierse Kempenzonen players
K.V.V. Thes Sport Tessenderlo players
Belgian football managers